Hanleya brachyplax is a species of chiton, a polyplacophoran mollusc, which is endemic to Brazil.

References

Fauna of Brazil
Chitons